Horatio Investments is an angel investment company based in Somerset. They invested their own money in early-stage high-growth marketing-led businesses based in the UK.

Their typical investment size is £500,000 into early-stage high growth businesses run by outstanding entrepreneurs.  In September 2014 they stopped investing directly into companies and invested in wave energy technologies to help them reach commercialisation, through the company Wavepower Technologies. Wavepower Technologies research and development activity ceased in 2017. Following the suspension of the wave energy research activity, Horatio focused again on angel investing across the UK.

History
Formed in 2010 by Martin Bowles, Horatio Investments was originally only an investor for small businesses in the South West of England and South Wales, though their investment strategy expanded to all UK businesses.

Recent deals
Between 2010 and 2013 Horatio Investments invested in 19 companies.  Most recently, Horatio has established and owns a new electric scooter retail business, Pure Scooters Ltd

In the press
Horatio Investments were included in an article in late 2012, named "22 business angels you need to know about", in which they were listed along such investors as Ron Conway and Reid Hoffman, the co-founder of LinkedIn.

References

Angel investors
2010 establishments in the United Kingdom